Viktor Borel (born 10 March 1974) is a Belarusian football coach and former player. As of 2015, he works as an assistant coach at FC Gomel.

Honours
Dinamo Minsk
Belarusian Premier League champion: 1995

Gomel
Belarusian Cup winner: 2001–02

Shakhtyor Soligorsk
Belarusian Premier League champion: 2005
Belarusian Cup winner: 2003–04

References

External links
Player profile at FC Gomel website

Profile at teams.by

1974 births
People from Petropavlovsk-Kamchatsky
Living people
Belarusian footballers
Belarusian expatriate footballers
Expatriate footballers in Russia
FC Gomel players
FC Dinamo Minsk players
FC Dinamo-93 Minsk players
FC Shakhtyor Soligorsk players
Association football forwards
FC Novokuznetsk players
FC Spartak Nizhny Novgorod players